"Count Your Blessings" is a hymn composed in 1897 by Johnson Oatman, Jr., with the tune being written by Edwin O. Excell. It is a standard part of many hymnals, and is well known in Christian circles.

References

External links
Story behind the Hymn

American Christian hymns
19th-century hymns